Himani Kapoor is an Indian singer and finalist of Sa Re Ga Ma Pa Challenge 2005. She also hosted a show with Karan Oberoi on Zee TV called "Antakshari". She also competed in Star Plus's Jo Jeeta Wohi Superstar. She gained wider recognition for singing song in Pagglait called "Thode Kam Ajnabi" composed by Arijit SIngh.

Career
She also competed in a show called Music Ka Maha Muqqabla on Star plus as Mika ki Sherni. She completed her world tour with Himesh Reshammiya in 2007 and has performed in 20 different countries.

She has sung in Dil Diya Hai, Aap Ki Khatir, Chingari, Bachna Ae Haseeno, Fool N Final, Oye Lucky! Lucky Oye! and Band Baaja Baaraat.

Himani received an award from the government of Haryana by chief minister Bhupinder Singh Hooda on women's day in year 2008. She released a song dedicated to Indira Gandhi on the occasion of women's day in 2010.

Discography

Music 
 Meri Maa / Maa Tu Sach Much Raani Maa - Mothers Day Special - 2016
 Ab Ke Saawan - Monsoon Special - 2016

References

External links
 

1988 births
Living people
Singers from Haryana
Indian women pop singers
People from Faridabad
Indian women television presenters
Indian television presenters
Women musicians from Haryana
21st-century Indian women singers
21st-century Indian singers